Maurice de Bus (30 December 1907 - 11 November 1963) was a French sculptor. He graduated from the École nationale supérieure des Beaux-Arts. He won the Prix de Rome in Sculpture in 1937. He lived at the Villa Medici in 1938–1939. He also designed coins for the Monnaie de Paris.

References

1907 births
1963 deaths
People from Seine-et-Marne
École des Beaux-Arts alumni
French male sculptors
20th-century French sculptors
Prix de Rome winners